Zainsk (Zäy) is a town in the Republic of Tatarstan, Russia, located on the Stepnoy Zay River (Kama's tributary),  east of Kazan. Population:

Geography
Zainsk Reservoir, along the Zay River, is located near the town.

History
It was founded in 1652–1656 as a fortress. It was granted urban-type settlement status in 1962, and was known as Novy Zay until 1978, when it was granted town status and renamed Zainsk.

Administrative and municipal status
Within the framework of administrative divisions, Zainsk serves as the administrative center of Zainsky District, even though it is not a part of it. As an administrative division, it is, together with the settlement of Karmalka, incorporated separately as the town of republic significance of Zainsk—an administrative unit with the status equal to that of the districts. As a municipal division, the town of republic significance of Zainsk is incorporated within Zainsky Municipal District as Zainsk Urban Settlement.

References

Notes

Sources

Cities and towns in Tatarstan
Menzelinsky Uyezd
Populated places established in the 1650s